Percobaltates are chemical compounds where the oxidation state of cobalt is +5. This is the highest established oxidation state of cobalt. The simplest of these are bi-metallic Group 1 oxides such as sodium percobaltate (Na3CoO4); which may be produced by the reaction of cobalt(II,III) oxide and sodium oxide, using oxygen as the oxidant:

 4 Co3O4 + 18 Na2O + 7 O2  → 12 Na3CoO4

The potassium salt can be synthesized similarly; its magnetic moment has indicated the existence of cobalt(V). No crystallographic analysis has been reported for either material.  Percobaltates can be stabilized by use of oxides or fluorides.

A number of organometallic Co(V) complexes have also been reported.

See also 
 Caesium hexafluorocobaltate(IV)

References 

Salts
Cobalt compounds
Oxometallates